is a song by Japanese boy band Arashi from their tenth studio album Beautiful World (2011). It was released as a CD single on 10 November 2010, through J Storm. "Hatenai Sora" was the theme song for the television drama Freeter, Ie wo Kau, which stars member Kazunari Ninomiya.

"Hatenai Sora" debuted at number one on the Oricon Singles Chart for the week ending 22 November 2010 with initial sales of 572,000 copies, making it Arashi's 30th number-one single in Japan. It debuted on the Billboard Japan Hot 100 at number 71 and reached the top of the chart three weeks later. In the same month of release, the single was certified double platinum by the Recording Industry Association of Japan (RIAJ) for shipment of 500,000 copies. According to Oricon, "Hatenai Sora" was the sixth best-selling single of 2010.

Track listing

References

2010 singles
2010 songs
Arashi songs
Billboard Japan Hot 100 number-one singles
Japanese television drama theme songs
J Storm singles
Oricon Weekly number-one singles